Leandro Lino dos Santos (born 25 July 1995) is a Brazilian futsal player who plays as a winger for Magnus Futsal and the Brazilian national futsal team.

References

External links
Liga Nacional de Futsal profile

1995 births
Living people
Futsal forwards
Brazilian men's futsal players